Radoslava Ivanova Slavcheva (born 18 July 1984) is a Bulgarian footballer who plays as a defender. She has been a member of the Bulgaria women's national team.

References

1984 births
Living people
Women's association football defenders
Bulgarian women's footballers
Bulgaria women's international footballers
Medyk Konin players
Bulgarian expatriate footballers
Bulgarian expatriate sportspeople in Greece
Expatriate women's footballers in Greece
Bulgarian expatriate sportspeople in Poland
Expatriate women's footballers in Poland
LP Super Sport Sofia players